William Jones, also known as Billy Jones, is a retired American basketball power forward. Jones attended the University of Maryland where he played for the Terrapins and in December 1965 became the first black player in the Atlantic Coast Conference. He lettered in basketball three years and played two seasons alongside future Hall of Fame Maryland head coach Gary Williams. By 1971, every school in the ACC had at least one African-American on its team.

References

Living people
American men's basketball players
Hamden Bics players
Maryland Terrapins men's basketball players
UMBC Retrievers men's basketball coaches
Towson High School alumni
Year of birth missing (living people)
Power forwards (basketball)